Lobach may refer to:

 Lobach (Eschbach), a river of North Rhine-Westphalia, Germany
 a district of Bevern, Lower Saxony, Germany
 Anastasia Lobach (born 1987), a Belarusian female handballer
 Tatiana Lobach (born 1974), Russian politician